Arabia Mountain High School Academy of Engineering Medicine and Environmental Studies is located on the edge of the Arabia Mountain green space in Stonecrest, Georgia, United States, with a Lithonia post office address. This public high school opened in August 2009. It is a LEED-certified building and uses the "Environment as an Integrating Context for learning" (EIC) curriculum. It is connected to the nature preserve via a spur bicycle path.

Athletics 
Arabia Mountain students compete in baseball, basketball, cross country, football, golf, gymnastics, soccer, softball, swimming, tennis, track, volleyball, and wrestling.

In 2015, the Baltimore Ravens drafted Arabia Mountain alumnus Breshad Perriman as the 26th pick in the first round of the NFL Draft.

Marching Band 
Led by Monica Fogg, the Arabia Mountain Marching Rams have performed in the High Stepping Nationals, Atlanta Football Classic Parade, Clark Atlanta University Homecoming Parade, Florida Classic Parade, and Magic City Classic Parade. The Marching Rams have also swept accolades in regional and state competitions showcased in the Metro Atlanta area

Notable alumni 
Jakobi Meyers - New England Patriots wide receiver
 Breshad Perriman - Tampa Bay Buccaneers wide receiver

References

External links

DeKalb County School District high schools
Educational institutions established in 2009
2009 establishments in Georgia (U.S. state)
Stonecrest, Georgia